Visa requirements for Chinese citizens of Macau are administrative entry restrictions by the authorities of other states placed on Chinese citizens who are permanent residents of Macau.

 Chinese citizens of Macau had visa-free or visa on arrival access to 141 countries and territories, ranking the Macao Special Administrative Region passport 33rd in terms of travel freedom according to the Henley Passport Index.

The Macau SAR Identification Department listed Chinese citizens of Macau as having visa-free or visa on arrival access to 144 countries and territories with the websites of the immigration authorities of 26 countries listed for electronic visa applications by Macau SAR passport .

Visa requirements map

COVID-19 pandemic
Due to the COVID-19 pandemic, most countries have imposed temporary travel restrictions on Chinese citizens or persons arriving from China.

 — entry ban on Chinese citizens travelling for private, educational, working and tourist purposes.
 – To avoid the spread of COVID-19, all Macau residents are not allowed to visit Taiwan from 7 February 2020, applicants should apply by desk at the representative offices of Taiwan and providing entry and departure records proving without travel records to the mainland China within 14 days if having special and emergency reasons.

Greater China including Taiwan

Visa requirements

Territories
Visa requirements for Chinese citizens of Macau for visits to various territories, disputed areas, partially recognised countries and restricted zones:

Timeline of visa-free access

Visa requirements were lifted for Portuguese Macau (unilaterally or bilaterally) by the Philippines on 22 June 1994
 
Visa requirements were lifted for Chinese citizens of Macau by the Czech Republic on 1 October 2001, Russia on 30 September 2012, New Zealand on 30 June 2014 and Belarus on 27 November 2016.

Non-visa restrictions

See also

Visa policy of Macau
Macau Special Administrative Region passport
List of nationalities forbidden at border

References and notes
References

Notes

Chinese citizens of Macau
Foreign relations of Macau